Nephus quadrimaculatus is a species of ladybird belonging to the family Coccinellidae. It was first described by Johann Friedrich Wilhelm Herbst in 1783.

Description
Elytra are black, each with two red-yellow, kidney-shaped spots.

Distribution
This species is present in most of Europe, inhabiting warm areas in the lowlands and on the lower slopes of mountains. It occurs in forests and parks on a variety of deciduous trees and ivy (Hedera species).

References

External links

 Biolib
 GBIF
 Ladybird Survey
 Atlas of Ladybirds of Russia
 Coleoptera Poloniae

Coccinellidae
Beetles described in 1783
Beetles of Europe
Taxa named by Johann Friedrich Wilhelm Herbst